Nautonivono is a privately leased island, also called "Yadua" (pronounced ).

The island is located at the centre of Fiji's Mamanuca Islands.

Islands of Fiji
Ba Province
Mamanuca Islands
Private islands of Fiji